Paul Leonard Lewin from the University of Southampton (UK), in Southampton, Hampshire, UK was named Fellow of the Institute of Electrical and Electronics Engineers (IEEE) in 2013 for contributions to high voltage cable engineering.

References 

Fellow Members of the IEEE
Living people
Year of birth missing (living people)
Place of birth missing (living people)